Acantharctia latifusca is a moth of the family Erebidae. It was described by George Hampson in 1907. It is found in Kenya and Uganda.

References

Moths described in 1907
Spilosomina
Insects of Uganda
Moths of Africa